Eridachtha is a genus of moth in the family Lecithoceridae.

Species
 Eridachtha calamopis Meyrick, 1920
 Eridachtha crossogramma (Meyrick, 1921)
 Eridachtha hapalochra Meyrick, 1932
 Eridachtha guttifera Gozmány, 1973
 Eridachtha kasyella Gozmány, 1978
 Eridachtha longicornella (Chrétien, 1915)
 Eridachtha parvella (Chrétien, 1915)
 Eridachtha phaeochlora Meyrick, 1920
 Eridachtha prolocha Meyrick, 1910

References

Natural History Museum Lepidoptera genus database

 
Lecithocerinae
Moth genera